Back Porch Video was one of the first cable television-based music video programs. It premiered on January 28, 1984 and was created with Russ Gibb, former owner of the Grande Ballroom in Detroit, Michigan. 

Shown out of Westinghouse's Group W Cable studios in Dearborn, Michigan, Back Porch Video stayed on the air for the better part of 16 years.

What made Back Porch Video unique was that it was crewed and hosted primarily by area high school students; the document of which is found in 2020 on YouTube. The program aired live in Dearborn from 10pm - 1am on Saturday nights. The show expanded to 9pm - 1am after about one year of cablecasting, adding additional hosts. The program saw a short run of three programs broadcast nationwide on Detroit's PBS station WTVS Channel 56.

In 1985, Back Porch Video won a CableACE Award.

References

External links 
 YouTube channel of BPV producer Lance "Lenny" Rosol

Articles
 Four Way Mirror - The Story of Back Porch Video (part one)
 Four Way Mirror - The Story of Back Porch Video (part two)
 Four Way Mirror - Behind the Scenes of Back Porch Video with Mohawk Mat Hunt: The Misfits Meet Mrs. Gibb
 Four Way Mirror - Behind the Scenes of Back Porch Video with Mohawk Mat Hunt: Henry Rollins Interview and After-Party 

Local music television shows in the United States
Television in Detroit
1980s American television series
1990s American television series